Herrliche Zeiten is a 2018 German comedy-drama film directed by Oskar Roehler, starring Katja Riemann and Oliver Masucci. It tells the story of an affluent couple looking for a new housekeeper. As a joke, they write in the ad that they are looking for "slaves", which has unexpected consequences.

Cast
 Katja Riemann as Evi Müller-Todt
 Oliver Masucci as Claus Müller-Todt
 Samuel Finzi as Bartos
 Lize Feryn as Svetlana
 Yasin El Harrouk
 Andrea Sawatzki
 Lena Schmidke
 Ilgar Khanikov 
 Sara Fazilat
 Gottfried Vollmer
 Katy Karrenbauer
 Aslan Aslan as Tarek
 Ivan Jurcevic as Bodyguard

Production
The film is based on the 2011 novel Subs written by Thor Kunkel. It is produced by Molina Film and co-produced by Tele München Gruppe. It received support from the Film- und Medienstiftung NRW, DFFF, BKM and Medienboard Berlin Brandenburg. Filming took place from 8 May to 20 June 2017 in and around Cologne.

Release
The film was released in German cinemas on 3 May 2018.

References

External links 
 

2018 films
Films based on German novels
Films directed by Oskar Roehler
Films scored by Martin Todsharow
Films shot in Cologne
German comedy-drama films
2010s German-language films
2010s German films
2018 comedy-drama films